Diceroprocta is a genus of scrub cicadas in the family Cicadidae. There are at least 60 described species in Diceroprocta.

Species
These 60 species belong to the genus Diceroprocta:

 Diceroprocta alacris (Stål, 1864) i c g
 Diceroprocta albomaculata Davis, 1928 i c g
 Diceroprocta apache (Davis, 1921) i c g b (citrus cicada)
 Diceroprocta apache-cinctifera-semicincta b
 Diceroprocta arizona (Davis, 1916) i c g b
 Diceroprocta aurantiaca Davis, 1938 i c g b
 Diceroprocta averyi Davis, 1941 i c g b
 Diceroprocta azteca (Kirkaldy, 1909) i c g b
 Diceroprocta bakeri (Distant, 1911) i c g
 Diceroprocta belizensis (Distant, 1910) i c g
 Diceroprocta bequaerti (Davis, 1917) i c g b
 Diceroprocta bibbyi Davis, 1928 i c g
 Diceroprocta bicolora Davis, 1935 i c g
 Diceroprocta biconica (Walker, 1850) i c g b (the Key's cicada)
 Diceroprocta bicosta (Walker, 1850) i c g
 Diceroprocta bimaculata (Sanborn, 2010) c g
 Diceroprocta bonhotei (Distant, 1901) i c g
 Diceroprocta bulgara (Distant, 1906) i c g
 Diceroprocta canescens Davis, 1935 i c g
 Diceroprocta castanea (Davis, W.T., 1916) c
 Diceroprocta caymanensis Davis, 1939 i c g
 Diceroprocta cinctifera (Uhler, 1892) i c g b
 Diceroprocta cleavesi Davis, 1930 i c g
 Diceroprocta crucifera (Walker, 1850) i c g
 Diceroprocta delicata (Osborn, 1906) i c g b
 Diceroprocta digueti (Distant, 1906) i c g
 Diceroprocta distanti Metcalf, 1963 i c g
 Diceroprocta eugraphica (Davis, 1916) i c g b
 Diceroprocta fraterna Davis, 1935 i c g
 Diceroprocta fusipennis (Walker, 1858) i c g
 Diceroprocta grossa (Fabricius, 1775) i c g
 Diceroprocta heathi (Sanborn, 2010) c g
 Diceroprocta knighti (Davis, 1917) i c g b
 Diceroprocta lata Davis, 1941 i c g
 Diceroprocta lucida Davis, 1934 i c g
 Diceroprocta marevagans Davis, 1928 i c g b
 Diceroprocta mesochlora (Walker, 1850) i c g
 Diceroprocta nigriventris (Walker, F., 1858) c g
 Diceroprocta oaxacaensis Sanborn, 2007 i c g
 Diceroprocta obscurior Davis, 1935 i c g
 Diceroprocta oculata Davis, 1935 i c g
 Diceroprocta oleacea (Distant, 1891) c g
 Diceroprocta olympusa (Walker, 1850) i c g b
 Diceroprocta operculabrunnea Davis, 1934 i c g
 Diceroprocta ornea (Walker, 1850) i c g
 Diceroprocta ovata Davis, 1939 i c g
 Diceroprocta pinosensis Davis, 1935 i c g
 Diceroprocta pronotolinea Sanborn, 2007 i c g
 Diceroprocta psophis (Walker, 1850) i c g
 Diceroprocta pusilla Davis, 1942 i c g
 Diceroprocta pygmaea (Fabricius, 1803) i c g
 Diceroprocta ruatana (Distant, 1891) i c g
 Diceroprocta semicincta (Davis, 1925) i c g b
 Diceroprocta swalei (Distant, 1904) i c g b
 Diceroprocta tepicana Davis, 1938 i c g
 Diceroprocta texana (Davis, 1916) i c g b
 Diceroprocta tibicen (Linnaeus, 1758) i g
 Diceroprocta virgulata (Distant, 1904) i c g
 Diceroprocta viridifascia (Walker, 1850) i c g b (salt marsh cicada)
 Diceroprocta vitripennis (Say, 1830) i c g b (green winged cicada)

Data sources: i = ITIS, c = Catalogue of Life, g = GBIF, b = Bugguide.net

References

Further reading

External links

 

 
Articles created by Qbugbot
Fidicinini
Cicadidae genera